Suna Murray (born April 16, 1955 in Tallahassee, Florida) is an American former figure skater. She twice won a bronze medal at the U.S. Figure Skating Championships and competed at the 1972 Winter Olympics.

Murray coaches at the Skating Club of Boston.  Her daughter Kylie Gleason is also an elite skater.  Her other daughter, Hadley Gleason, is a graduate of Trinity College playing both field and ice hockey. She is a technical panel member for US Figure Skating.

She graduated from Columbia High School, Maplewood, NJ and Harvard University.

Results

References

External links
 Where Are They Now: Suna Murray

American female single skaters
Figure skaters at the 1972 Winter Olympics
Olympic figure skaters of the United States
1955 births
Living people
Sportspeople from Tallahassee, Florida
Harvard College alumni
21st-century American women